Bad Granny is a vehicle modification TV show, hosted by Jason Reece in Trinidad and Tobago.

The planned season is 13 episodes each 30 minutes long, and will be airing once weekly.

References

Trinidad and Tobago television series
2010s reality television series
2013 television series debuts